Janusz Wojcieszak (1953–2012) was a Polish philologist and philosopher, specialist in the history, literature and culture of Latin America. He graduated from Warsaw University's Department of Spanish Studies in 1977 and the following year was hired by his alma mater as an assistant, eventually rising to the rank of professor. He committed suicide in October 2012. Initially declared missing, his body was found floating in the Vistula close to Gdański Bridge on 17 October 2012.

In addition to his own works, he translated numerous books by Spanish and Latin American authors. Among them were works by: 
 José Ortega y Gasset (Meditaciones del Quijote, published in 2008), 
 José Piñera (Without Fear of the Future: The political economy of the retirement system in Chile; 1996), 
 Horacio Cerutti Guldberg (Filosofía nuestroamericana; 2011), 
 Alfonso Reyes (Notas sobre la inteligencia americana; 1994). 
 Tzvetan Todorov (The Conquest of America: The Question of the Other; 1996), 
 Fernando Savater (Ética para Amador, 1996), 
 José Vasconcelos (La Raza Cósmica, 1993)

1953 births
2012 deaths
20th-century Polish philosophers
21st-century Polish philosophers
Polish philologists
Polish translators
University of Warsaw alumni
Academic staff of the University of Warsaw
20th-century translators
21st-century translators